The Morrison Hills are a series of rugged east–west trending hills between Garrard Glacier and Hewson Glacier in the Queen Alexandra Range of Antarctica. They were named by the Advisory Committee on Antarctic Names after Lieutenant I. James Morrison, U.S. Navy, who did preliminary work leading to the induction of C-130 aircraft into Antarctica in February 1960, and who also participated in U.S. Navy Operation Deep Freeze for several seasons from 1958 to 1959.

References

External links

Hills of the Ross Dependency
Shackleton Coast